Acmella repens is a North American species of flowering plants in the family Asteraceae. The plant is native to the southeastern and south-central United States, primarily in the coastal plain from Texas to North Carolina and in the lower Mississippi Valley from Missouri to Louisiana. There are additional populations in Coahuila in northeastern Mexico.

References 

repens
Flora of the Southeastern United States
Plants described in 1788
Flora of Texas
Flora of Missouri
Flora of Coahuila